The Léfini Faunal Reserve is a protected reserve of Congo. It was established on November 26, 1951. This site covers 6,300.00 km².

References

Protected areas of the Republic of the Congo
Faunal reserves
Western Congolian forest–savanna mosaic